Vinda International Holdings Limited is a major hygiene company in Asia. Its tissue paper products with brand name "Vinda" has been recognized as a "China famous brand". Its headquarters is in the Donghou Industrial Development Zone (S: 东侯工业区, T: 東侯工業區, P: Dōnghóu Gōngyèqū) in Huicheng Town in Xinhui District, Jiangmen, Guangdong. 

Vinda was founded in 1985 by Mr. Li Chaowang in Xinhui, Guangdong. In 1999, Vinda International Holdings Limited, Vinda's holding company, was incorporated in the Cayman Islands. In 2007, it was listed on the Hong Kong Stock Exchange with IPO price of HK$3.68 per share and totally HK$1 billion fund raising.

References

External links
 Vinda International Holdings Limited

Companies listed on the Hong Kong Stock Exchange
Privately held companies of China
Pulp and paper companies of China
Chinese companies established in 1985
Companies based in Jiangmen
Chinese brands